Down There is a 78-minute 2006 Belgian-French English- and French-language independent documentary art film directed by Chantal Akerman.

Description and synopsis

The film, which premiered at the 56th Berlin International Film Festival and was released on DVD in 2016 as part of a boxset also containing D’Est (1993), Sud (1999), and De l’autre côté (2002), documents Akerman's spending of a month in Tel Aviv-Yafo, in an apartment by the sea, contemplating her family, her Jewish identity, and her childhood.

References

External links

 (Icarus Films's Channel)

2006 documentary films
2006 independent films
2006 films
Autobiographical documentary films
Belgian documentary films
Belgian independent films
Documentary films about families
Documentary films about Israel
Documentary films about women in film
Films directed by Chantal Akerman
Films set in Tel Aviv
Films shot in Israel
French documentary films
French independent films
2000s French-language films
Self-reflexive films
2000s English-language films
2006 multilingual films
Belgian multilingual films
French multilingual films
2000s French films